Ernsbach may refer to:

Ernsbach (Kocher), a river of Baden-Württemberg, Germany, tributary of the Kocher
Ernsbach (Riedbach), a river of Baden-Württemberg, Germany, tributary of the Riedbach